David Mark Hill (May 24, 1960 – June 6, 2008) was an American spree killer who killed three people in South Carolina.

Life 
Hill married Jacqueline Hill in 1991. They had three children, one of whom required the use of a wheelchair after an accident. After that incident, Hill experienced depression, panic attacks and seizures. 

In 1996, Hill received notice that his wife was filing for divorce, and he was accused of sexually abusing his daughter, who was quadriplegic. On September 16 of that year, Hill went to a North Augusta social services office and killed Michael Gregory, Josie Curry and Jimmy Riddle, who all worked at the office. According to court documents, Hill killed Riddle because he was involved in the case that removed his children from his home, killed Gregory because he had seen him with the gun, and killed Curry "because she was black."

At trial in 2000, Hill's wife testified that he had tried to kill himself at least three times.

Hill was executed via lethal injection on June 6, 2008, in South Carolina. He was pronounced dead at 6:17 pm.

See also 
 Capital punishment in South Carolina
 Capital punishment in the United States
 List of people executed in South Carolina
 List of people executed in the United States in 2008
 List of white defendants executed for killing a black victim

References 

1960 births
2008 deaths
20th-century American criminals
21st-century executions by South Carolina
People from South Carolina
American people executed for murder
American spree killers
Executed spree killers
People convicted of murder by South Carolina
People executed by South Carolina by lethal injection
American male criminals
Racially motivated violence against African Americans